Yigal Allon (10 October 1918 – 29 February 1980) was an Israeli military leader and politician. He was a commander of the Palmach and a general in the Israeli Defense Forces (IDF). He was also a leader of the Ahdut HaAvoda and Israeli Labor parties. He served briefly as acting Prime Minister of Israel between the death of Levi Eshkol and the appointment of Golda Meir in 1969, the first native-born Israeli to serve in the position. He was a government minister from the third Knesset to the ninth inclusive.

Born a child of pioneer settlers in the Lower Galilee, Allon initially rose to prominence through his military career. After the outbreak of the 1936–1939 Arab revolt in Palestine, he joined the Haganah and later the Palmach. He commanded a squad and organized key operations in the Jewish Resistance Movement such as the Night of the Bridges. During the 1947–1949 Palestine war, Allon commanded the conquest of the Galilee, Lod and Ramla, as well as the entire Negev up to Eilat as Head of the Southern Command.

Allon entered politics after a forced relief from command by then-Premier David Ben-Gurion. During his political career, he served as foreign and education minister, deputy prime minister, and briefly as acting prime minister. He was one of the architects of the creation of the Labor party, advocating for the merge of Ahdut HaAvoda with Mapai. 

In 1967, he devised the eponymous Allon Plan, which proposed next steps for Israel after the 1967 Arab–Israeli War. While the plan was not officially adopted, it served as a guideline for the next decade of Israeli settlement. He also took part in the Sinai Interim Agreement in 1975. He is considered to have a reputation of missing opportunities for greatness, for example he lost the position of Defense Minister to his political rival, Moshe Dayan.

In 1980, Allon died unexpectedly due to cardiac arrest while campaigning for the leadership of the Labor party.

Early years (1918-1931) 
Yigal Peikowitz (later Allon) was born on 10 October 1918 in Kfar Tavor, then a part of the Occupied Enemy Territory Administration. His father, Reuven, immigrated to Palestine in 1890 along with his father and elder brother from Belarus, then a part of the Russian Empire. His mother, Haia Shortz-Peikowitz, came from a Jewish family of Safed. Her father was a founding member of Rosh Pinna.

Allon's father initially wanted to name him "Yigael", meaning "he will be redeemed", but decided it was too passive, and instead decided on "Yigal", meaning "he will redeem".

When Allon was five years old, his mother passed away and his older brothers left home. Allon, the youngest child, remained with his father. The area of Kfar Tavor was isolated and dealt with regular raids and thefts by neighboring Arab and Bedouin communities. After his bar mitzvah at age 13, Allon was given a gun by his father to protect the family crops from thieves.

In 1934, 16-year-old Allon began attending the Kadoorie Agricultural High School. Here, he became aware that his home education was poor compared to his classmates from urban areas. His teachers encouraged him to expand his horizons and close gaps in his education. In his autobiography, Allon praised the school director and claimed that he taught Allon important social values.

During school, Allon adopted Labor Zionism. After graduating in 1937, Allon and a group of Labor Zionists founded the Kibbutz Ginosar on Palestine Jewish Colonization Association land leased to the settlement of Migdal. In Ginosar, Allon made an impression as a local leader and became friends with Berl Katznelson.

Military career (1931–1950) 

Allon joined Haganah in 1931 and went on to command a field unit and then a mobile patrol in northern Palestine during the 1936–1939 Arab revolt in Palestine. During the revolt, while working on the fields and farms of the kibbutz, Allon was summoned to take a position of command in the Haganah by Yitzhak Sadeh. After completing a squad command course, Allon was appointed to the command of the Mobile Guards. He took part in the expulsion of Arabs who immigrated with their flocks to the Jewish fields. He also became known for the ambushes he planned for gangs that infiltrated the settlements.

During this period, Allon participated in several operations of the Special Night Squads (SNS), under the command of Orde Charles Wingate and Bala Bredin. In 1941, he became one of the founding members of the Palmach. From 1941 to 1942, he was a scout with the British forces of Syria and Lebanon. 
In 1945, he became Commander in Chief of the Palmach. On 22 June 1948, at the climax of David Ben-Gurion's confrontation with the Irgun over the distribution of weapons from the Altalena, Allon commanded the troops that were ordered to shell the vessel. During the 1948 Arab–Israeli War, he led several of the major operations on all three fronts, including operations Yiftach in the Galilee, Danny in the centre, and Yoav and Horev in the Negev. His last major military roles as commander were in October and December 1948: Operation Yoav towards the Hebron Hills and Operation Horev along the Southern Egyptian Front. As Operational Commander of the Southern Command, he was responsible for security along the borders with Egypt and parts of Jordan.

On 18 October 1949, while he was in an official visit in Paris, Allon was told by his French hosts that Ben-Gurion had decided to replace Allon with Moshe Dayan as Operational Commander. Most of Allon's staff officers resigned in protest. He retired from active service in 1950.

Political career (1950-1980) 
In January 1948, Allon helped form the left-wing Mapam party. However, Prime Minister Ben-Gurion, leader of the rival governing Mapai party, told Allon to dissociate himself from Mapam, as saw it as too left-wing and a threat to state security. In December 1948, Mapam co-leader Meir Ya'ari criticized Allon's use of tens of thousands of Palestinian refugees to achieve strategic goals.

From 1950 to 1952, he studied philosophy and history at St Antony's College, Oxford.

After ending his military career, Allon embarked on a public political career. He became a prominent leader in Ahdut HaAvoda, which had split from Mapam in 1954, and was first elected to the Knesset in 1955, where he served until his death. He was a member of the Economic Affairs Committee, Constitution, Law and Justice Committee, Education and Culture Committee, Joint Committee on the Motion for the Agenda Regarding Sports in Israel, and the Foreign Affairs and Defense Committee.

Allon served as the Labor Minister from 1961 to 1968. In this role he worked to improve the state employment service, extend the road network, and fought to get legislation on labor relations passed. From 1968 to 1969, he served as the Deputy Prime Minister and Minister of Immigrant Absorption. Allon served briefly as interim Prime Minister following the death of Levi Eshkol on 26 February 1969. He held office until 17 March 1969, when Golda Meir took over after being elected leader of the Labor Party. He became the Deputy Prime Minister and Minister of Education and Culture in Meir's government, and served in that post until 1974.

During the September 1970 crisis in Jordan, he advocated supporting King Hussein in his conflict with the PLO. In 1974 he was a part of the delegation to the Separation of Forces Agreement. He became the Minister of Foreign Affairs in 1974 and held this post until 1977. At the time of his sudden death in 1980, he was a candidate for the leadership of the Alignment, challenging the incumbent party head Shimon Peres.

Allon Plan (1967) 

Allon was the architect of the Allon Plan, a proposal to end Israeli occupation of parts of the West Bank with a negotiated partition of territories. The plan was presented to the cabinet in July 1967, right after the Six-Day War. The plan was never formally adopted, but influenced Israeli settlement for the next decade. 

According to the plan, Israel would retain one-third of the West Bank and protect itself from invasion from the east by a strip of settlements and military installations along the Jordan Valley. The mountain ridge west of this strip, which was populated by Arabs, would be confederated with Jordan. A strip of land flanking the Jericho-Jerusalem road, Gush Etzion and a large part of the Hebron Hills area, would be annexed. Minor territorial changes would be made along the Green Line, specifically in the area of Latrun. Allon also called for the development of Jewish neighborhoods in east Jerusalem, the rehabilitation of the Old City's Jewish Quarter, and the annexation of Gaza, whose Arab inhabitants would be resettled elsewhere.

Death (1980) 
Allon died of heart failure in Afula on 29 February 1980. He was buried in the cemetery of Kibbutz Ginosar (Kibbutz Ginosar Cemetery) in the Northern District on the shore of the Sea of Galilee. The funeral was attended by tens of thousands of mourners, with condolences extended by many world leaders, including Egyptian president Anwar Sadat.

Legacy 
Explaining the growing admiration for Yigal Allon three decades after his death, Oren Dagan of the Society for the Preservation of Israel Heritage Sites said, "people wish to live in the kind of state Yigal Allon dreamed of, for example on the Arab-Jewish issue. This isn't a post-Zionist approach, neither hesitant nor apologetic. It's an approach of safety and security that says, 'Our place is here,' but still emphasizes the importance of dialogue, and never through condescension or arrogance. Allon extended a hand in peace, and that's the approach we want leaders to adopt today."

Personal life 
Allon was married to Ruth, who made immigrated to Palestine from Germany in 1934, a year after the installment of the Nazi regime. They had three children together. Their eldest daughter Nurit was on the autism spectrum and could not speak until age 5. After years of consulting medical professionals in multiple continents on how to treat her, Nurit was eventually institutionalized in Scotland. Allon visited her once a year.

In 1948, after the proclamation of the state of Israel, Allon changed his surname from "Peikowitz" to "Allon", meaning "oak tree".

In the 1950s, the Allon couple helped their neighbors adopt a child, Tziona Heiman, from a Jerusalem hospital. This became associated with the wider Yemenite Children Affair of the time, in which thousands of Jewish babies, mainly from Yemen, appeared as candidates for adoption in Israel. Heiman said she was treated well and lovingly by her adoptive parents and by Allon. In an interview, Allon's wife stated they had no knowledge of Heiman's origin. As of 2016, Heiman's origins remained unclear.

Published works

Further reading

References

External links 

1918 births
1980 deaths
Alumni of St Antony's College, Oxford
People from Kfar Tavor
Ashkenazi Jews in Mandatory Palestine
Ashkenazi Jews in Ottoman Palestine
Haganah members
Palmach members
Israeli generals
Kibbutzniks
Jewish Israeli politicians
Leaders of political parties in Israel
Prime Ministers of Israel
Alignment (Israel) politicians
Ahdut HaAvoda politicians
Israeli Labor Party politicians
Ministers of Education of Israel
Ministers of Foreign Affairs of Israel
Israeli people of Romanian-Jewish descent
Members of the 3rd Knesset (1955–1959)
Members of the 4th Knesset (1959–1961)
Members of the 5th Knesset (1961–1965)
Members of the 6th Knesset (1965–1969)
Members of the 7th Knesset (1969–1974)
Members of the 8th Knesset (1974–1977)
Members of the 9th Knesset (1977–1981)
Israeli people of the 1948 Arab–Israeli War